The Scottish Horse War Memorial is a monument in Kensington, Johannesburg, South Africa. It was built on Caledonia Hill, between Somerset Road on the north side, Katoomba Street on the east, Highland Rd on the south, and Good Hope Street on the west.

The monument was designed by William Tait-Conner and unveiled on May 19, 1904. It consists of a Celtic cross embossed on a granite-lined pedestal. The Memorial can be reached by steps from Highland Rd and is a popular lookout with a view of the surrounding suburbs, and beyond them of the Hillbrow Tower downtown.

References

External links 
 
 
 

Buildings and structures in Johannesburg
Second Boer War memorials